Corrimal was an electoral district for the Legislative Assembly in the Australian State of New South Wales from 1968 to 1988, named after the suburb of Corrimal. It was replaced by Keira. Its only member was Laurie Kelly, representing the Labor Party.

Members for Corrimal

Election results

References

Former electoral districts of New South Wales
1968 establishments in Australia
Constituencies established in 1968
1988 disestablishments in Australia
Constituencies disestablished in 1988